Weldona is an unincorporated town, a post office, and a census-designated place (CDP) located in and governed by Morgan County, Colorado, United States. The CDP is a part of the Fort Morgan, CO Micropolitan Statistical Area. The Weldona post office has the ZIP Code 80653. At the United States Census 2020, the population of the Weldona CDP was 113.

History
The Weldona post office has been in operation since 1907. The community was named after one General Weldon.

Geography

Demographics

Education
The Weldon Valley School District RE-20J serves Weldona.

See also

Colorado census designated places
Morgan County, Colorado
Fort Morgan Micropolitan Statistical Area

References

External links
Weldona @ UncoverColorado.com
Weldon Valley School District RE-20J
Morgan County website

Census-designated places in Morgan County, Colorado
Census-designated places in Colorado